The 2013 season was Rosenborg's 23rd consecutive year in Tippeligaen, their 46th season in the top flight of Norwegian football and first season with Per Joar Hansen as manager. They participated in the Tippeligaen, finishing second, the Cup and the 2013–14 UEFA Europa League, entering at the First qualifying round stage and reaching the Second qualifying round before an aggregate defeat to St Johnstone.

Squad

On Loan

Transfers

Winter

In:

Out:

Summer

In:

Out:

Competitions

Tippeligaen

Results summary

Results by round

Results

Table

Norwegian Cup

Final

Europa League

Qualifying phase

Copa del Sol

Group stage

Club Friendlies

Squad statistics

Appearances and goals

   

|-
|colspan="14"|Players away from Rosenborg on loan:

|-
|colspan="14"|Players who left Rosenborg during the season:

|}

Goal scorers

Disciplinary record

Notes

References

2013
Rosenborg
Rosenborg